The Carroll rearrangement is a rearrangement reaction in organic chemistry and involves the transformation of a β-keto allyl ester into a α-allyl-β-ketocarboxylic acid. This organic reaction is accompanied by decarboxylation and the final product is a γ,δ-allylketone. The Carroll rearrangement is an adaptation of the Claisen rearrangement and effectively a decarboxylative allylation.

Reaction mechanism 
The Carroll rearrangement (1940) in the presence of base and with high reaction temperature (path A) takes place through an intermediate enol which then rearranges in an electrocyclic Claisen rearrangement. The follow-up is a decarboxylation. With palladium(0) as a catalyst, the reaction (Tsuji, 1980) is much milder (path B) with an intermediate allyl cation / carboxylic acid anion organometallic complex.

Decarboxylation precedes allylation as evidenced by this reaction catalyzed by tetrakis(triphenylphosphine)palladium(0):

Asymmetric decarboxylative allylation
By introducing suitable chiral ligands, the reaction becomes enantioselective. 

The first reported asymmetric rearrangement is catalyzed by tris(dibenzylideneacetone)dipalladium(0) and the Trost ligand:

A similar reaction uses additional naphthol.

This reaction delivers the main enantiomer with 88% enantiomeric excess. It remains to be seen if this reaction will have a wide scope because the acetamido group appears to be a prerequisite.

The same catalyst but a different ligand is employed in this enantioconvergent reaction:

The scope is extended to asymmetric α-alkylation of ketones masked as their enol carbonate esters:

References 

Rearrangement reactions
Palladium
Name reactions